The 1977 Akron Zips football team represented Akron University in the 1977 NCAA Division II football season as an independent. Led by fifth-year head coach Jim Dennison, the Zips played their home games at the Rubber Bowl in Akron, Ohio. They finished the season with a record of 6–4–1.

Schedule

References

Akron
Akron Zips football seasons
Akron Zips football